Yellow Furze is a small village in County Meath, Ireland. It is located 5 km southwest of Slane, on the boundary between the townlands of Dollardstown (Baile an Dolardaigh) and Seneschalstown (Baile an tSeanascail). 

Yellow Furze is in the Catholic parish of Beauparc, which extends over an area on the south side of the River Boyne between Navan and Slane. The village church is the Church of the Assumption and there is a cemetery next to it.

Popular culture
A song "The Lady from Yellow Furze" was recorded by Christy Moore on his 1993 album "King Puck".

See also
List of towns and villages in Ireland

References

Towns and villages in County Meath